Charles Dominique Fouqueray (Le Mans, 23 April 1869 – 28 March 1956) was a French painter. He studied at the École des Beaux Arts in Paris under Alexandre Cabanel and Fernand Cormon. From 1908 he was Peintre de la Marine, following the career of his father, a naval officer. He was recipient of the 1909 Prix Rosa Bonheur, then in 1914 the first Prix de l'Indochine.

References

1869 births
1956 deaths
French illustrators
French history painters
Members of the Académie des beaux-arts
Peintres de la Marine
People from Le Mans
French poster artists
19th-century French painters
French male painters
20th-century French painters
20th-century French male artists
19th-century French male artists